Events from the year 1385 in Ireland.

Incumbent
Lord: Richard II

Events
Battle of Tochar Cruachain-Bri-Ele
Alexander de Balscot, Bishop of Ossory appointed Lord Chancellor of Ireland

Deaths
Tanaide Ó Maolconaire, poet.

References